Green Pastures is a historic home and farm complex and national historic district located near Middleburg, Fauquier County, Virginia. Recognized as having been owned by industrialist and financier Robert Earll McConnell, the district encompasses 13 contributing buildings built between 1931 and 1947.  The include a Colonial Revival style manor house inspired by Mount Vernon, a smokehouse, stable, hostlers' quarters, farmer's cottage, garage and cow shed, chicken house and cow barn designed by New York architect Penrose V. Stout and built between 1931 and
1932; a stone sheep shed, a masonry workshop, a metal machine shed and log cabin built between
1935 and 1947. The frame manor house consist of a -story, seven-bay central section flanked by hyphens connected to two-story flanking wings.

It was listed on the National Register of Historic Places in 2002.

References

Farms on the National Register of Historic Places in Virginia
Colonial Revival architecture in Virginia
Houses completed in 1932
Houses in Fauquier County, Virginia
National Register of Historic Places in Fauquier County, Virginia
Houses on the National Register of Historic Places in Virginia